U of G may refer to:

in Austria
 University of Graz

in Belgium
 University of Ghent

in Canada
 University of Guelph

in Ghana
 University of Ghana 

in Guyana
 University of Guyana

in Mexico
 University of Guadalajara

in Poland
 University of Gdańsk

in the United States
 University of Georgia
 University of Guam, in the U.S. territory of Guam

See also
 UG (disambiguation)